Outpost is a board game published by TimJim Games from 1991 to 1994.  Players start with factory and population tokens and compete to acquire victory points through stylized economic activity using production output cards to the buy more factories and population, and special ability cards including the titular Outpost. In 2011 Stronghold Games reprinted Outpost with a new "kicker" mechanic providing additional cards to bid on.

Board games introduced in 1991
Economic simulation board games